Luton is a town and unitary authority with borough status, in Bedfordshire, England. At the 2021 census, the Luton/Dunstable urban area, including the adjacent towns of Dunstable and Houghton Regis, had a population of 286,450.  

The town's foundation dates to the sixth century as a Saxon settlement on the river, from which Luton derives its name. Luton is recorded in the Domesday Book as Loitone and Lintone and one of the largest churches in Bedfordshire, St Mary's Church, was built in the 12th century. There are local museums which explore Luton's history in Wardown Park and Stockwood Park.

Luton was, for many years, widely known for hatmaking and also had a large Vauxhall Motors factory. Car production at the plant began in 1905 and continued until the plant's closure in 2002. Production of commercial vehicles continues and the head office of Vauxhall Motors was in the town for many years, but relocated in 2019 to the village of Chalton, Bedfordshire on the northern border of the Borough of Luton. Transport is provided by London Luton Airport, which opened in 1938 and is now one of Britain's major airports, with three railway stations also in the town. The University of Bedfordshire was created from a merger with the University of Luton; two of its campuses are in Luton.

Luton Town Football Club, nicknamed the Hatters, due to the town's connection to hatmaking, has had several spells in the top flight of the English league as well as a Football League Cup triumph in 1988. They play at Kenilworth Road, their home since 1905; planning permission for a new larger stadium was approved in 2019. Luton International Carnival, the largest one-day carnival in Europe, is held on the day before the last Monday in May; the Saint Patrick's festival is held on the weekend nearest to Saint Patrick's Day as there is a large Irish community in Luton. The town also has a large Pakistani community which, along with the Irish, were attracted to employment at the Vauxhall car plant. Luton Hoo is an English country house, estate and Grade I listed building originally designed by Scottish architect Robert Adam but later transformed to the designs of Robert Smirke.

Toponymy
Luton's earliest recorded name is Lygea-Byrig, where Lygea means 'a river in an open field' and Byrig means 'a town'. The name shown as gradually converting to Luton over the centuries with Lvton being the used in the charter of Charles I.

History

Luton is believed to have been founded by the Anglo-Saxons sometime in the 6th century.

The Domesday Book records Luton as Loitone and as Lintone. Agriculture dominated the local economy at that time, and the town's population was around 700 to 800. 

 
In 1121 Robert, 1st Earl of Gloucester started work on St Mary's Church in the centre of the town. The work was completed by 1137. A motte-and-bailey castle which gives its name to the modern Castle Street was built in 1139 but demolished by 1154.

The hat making industry began in the 17th century and became synonymous with the town.

The town grew: in 1801 the population was 3,095, but by 1850 it was over 10,000 and by 1901 it was almost 39,000.

Newspaper printing arrived in the town in 1854. The first public cemetery was opened in the same year and Luton was made a borough in 1876.

Luton's hat trade reached its peak in the 1930s, but severely declined after the Second World War and was replaced by other industries.

In 1907, Vauxhall Motors opened the largest car plant in the United Kingdom in Luton, during the Second World War, it built Churchill tanks as part of the war effort. Despite heavy camouflage, the factory made Luton a target for the Luftwaffe and the town suffered a number of air raids. 107 died and there was extensive damage to the town (over 1,500 homes were damaged or destroyed).

The original town hall was destroyed in 1919 during Peace Day celebrations at the end of the First World War. Dr. John G. Dony, author of The Flora of Bedfordshire told his history students (he taught at Luton Grammar, predecessor of Luton Sixth Form College), during the 1950s, that he had broken the last intact window of the old town hall during the 1919 riots. Local people, including many ex-servicemen, were unhappy with unemployment and had been refused the use of a local park to hold celebratory events. They stormed the town hall, setting it alight (see Luton Town Hall). A replacement building was completed in 1936.

Luton Borough Corporation had provided the borough with electricity since the early twentieth century from Luton power station, located adjacent to the railway. Upon nationalisation of the electricity industry in 1948 ownership passed to the British Electricity Authority and later to the Central Electricity Generating Board. Electricity connections to the national grid rendered the 23 megawatt (MW) coal and latterly oil-fired power station redundant. The station had a single chimney and two reinforced concrete cooling towers. The power station closed in 1968; in its final year of operation it delivered 3,192 MWh of electricity to the borough.

Luton Airport opened in 1938, owned and operated by the council. It's now one of the largest employers in the area.

The pre-war years, were something of an economic boom for Luton, as new industries grew and prospered. New private and council housing was built in the 1920s and 1930s, with Luton starting to incorporate nearby villages Leagrave, Limbury and Stopsley between 1928 and 1933.

Post-war, a number of substantial estates of council housing were built, notably at Farley Hill, Stopsley, Limbury, Marsh Farm and Leagrave (Hockwell Ring). The Marsh Farm area of the town was developed in the mid to late 1960s as a large council housing estate, mostly to house the overspill population from London. However, the estate gained a reputation for high levels of crime, poverty and unemployment, which culminated in a riot on the estate in July 1992 and another more serious riot three years later.

The closure of the Vauxhall manufacturing plant in 2002 had negative effects for Luton, leading to increased unemployment and deprivation.

Governance

The town is situated within the ceremonial county of Bedfordshire but, since 1997, Luton has been an administratively independent unitary authority, administered by Luton Borough Council. There are 48 councillors on the Borough Council, representing 19 wards.

, Luton is represented in Parliament by Sarah Owen who holds Luton North and Rachel Hopkins who holds Luton South.
 
In 1876 the town council was granted its own coat of arms. The wheatsheaf was used on the crest to represent agriculture and the supply of straw used in the local hatmaking industry (the straw plaiting industry was brought to Luton by a group of Scots under the protection of Sir John Napier of Luton Hoo). The bee is traditionally the emblem of industry and the hive represents the straw plaiting industry for which Luton was famous. The rose is from the arms of the Napier family, whereas the thistle is a symbol for Scotland. An alternative suggestion is that the rose was a national emblem, and the thistle represents the Marquess of Bute, who formerly owned the Manor of Luton Hoo.

Geography

Luton is 28 miles north of London and 39 miles southwest of Cambridge. The town forms the core part of the wider Luton built-up area which includes the nearby towns of Dunstable and Houghton Regis which are in Central Bedfordshire. The town is the largest town in the ceremonial county of Bedfordshire followed by Bedford.

Luton is located in a break in the eastern part of the Chiltern Hills. The Chilterns are a mixture of chalk from the Cretaceous period (about 66 – 145 million years ago) and deposits laid at the southernmost points of the ice sheet during the last ice age (the Warden Hill area can be seen from much of the town).

Bedfordshire had a reputation for brick making but the industry is now significantly reduced. The brickworks at Stopsley took advantage of the clay deposits in the east of the town.

The source of the River Lea, part of the Thames Valley drainage basin, is in the Leagrave area of the town. The Great Bramingham Wood surrounds this area. It is classified as ancient woodland; records mention the wood at least 400 years ago.

There are few routes through the hilly area for some miles, this has led to several major roads (including the M1 and the A6) and a major rail-link being constructed through the town.

Climate
Luton has a temperate marine climate, like much of the British Isles, with generally light precipitation throughout the year. The weather is very changeable from day to day and the warming influence of the Gulf Stream makes the region mild for its latitude.

Records for Rothamsted date back to 1901.

Demography

The United Kingdom Census 2011 showed that the borough had a population of 203,201, a 10.2% increase from the previous census in 2001, when Luton was the 27th largest settlement in the United Kingdom. In 2011, 46,756 were aged under 16, 145,208 were 16 to 74, and 11,237 were 75 or over.

Local inhabitants are known as Lutonians.

Ethnicity

Luton has seen several waves of immigration. In the early part of the 20th century, there was internal migration of Irish and Scottish people to the town. These were followed by Afro-Caribbean and Asian immigrants. More recently immigrants from European countries have made Luton their home. As a result of this Luton has a diverse ethnic mix, with a significant population of Asian descent, mainly Pakistani 29,353 (14.4%) and Bangladeshi 13,606 (6.7%). The latter two also make up most of the Muslim religious population in Luton, which is the third highest for a town or city in England by proportion.

Since the 2011 census, Luton has had a white British population less than 50%, one of three towns in the United Kingdom along with Leicester and Slough. Luton has a majority white population when non-British white people are included, such as the Irish and Eastern Europeans. 81% of the population of Luton define themselves as British.

Religion
At the 2011 census, the religious affiliation of Luton was as follows:

Economy

Luton's economy has traditionally been focused on several different areas of industry, including car manufacturing, engineering and millinery. However, today, Luton is moving towards a service based economy mainly in the retail and the airport sectors, although there is still a focus on light industry in the town.

Notable firms with headquarters in Luton include:
EasyJet – head office (originally EasyLand, later moved into Hangar 89) and main base at London Luton Airport
Impellam Group – headquarters at Capability Green
TUI UK (TUI Airways) – travel (Wigmore House)
Vauxhall Motors – headquarters (Chalton House)

Notable firms with offices in Luton include:
Anritsu – electronics
AstraZeneca – pharmaceuticals
Selex ES – aerospace
Ernst & Young – accountants
Whitbread – hospitality
Stonegate Pub Company – hospitality

Luton's post-war and more recent industrial decline has been compared to that of similar towns in northern England.

Employment
Of the town's working population (classified 16–74 years of age by the Office for National Statistics), 63% are employed. This figure includes students, the self-employed and those who are in part-time employment. 11% are retired, 8% look after the family or take care of the home and 5% are unemployed.

Transport

The town has three railway stations: Luton, Leagrave and Luton Airport Parkway that are served by East Midlands Railway and Thameslink services.

Luton is also home to London Luton Airport, one of the major feeder airports for London and the south-east. A light metro people mover track, Luton DART, opened in 2023, linking the airport and Luton Airport Parkway railway station.

A network of bus services run by Arriva Shires & Essex, Grant Palmer and Centrebus serves the urban area of Luton and Dunstable. A bus rapid transit route opened in 2013, called the Luton to Dunstable Busway, connecting the town with the airport, Dunstable and Houghton Regis. Hertfordshire-based bus operator Uno also run buses on their 'Dragonfly' 610 route to Hatfield, Potters Bar and Cockforsters 

Luton is also served by a large taxi network. As a unitary authority, Luton Borough Council is responsible for the local highways and public transport in the borough and licensing of taxis.

Education

Luton is one of the main locations of the University of Bedfordshire. A large campus of the university is in Luton town centre, with a smaller campus based on the edge of town in Putteridge Bury, an old Victorian manor house. The other campuses of the university are located in Bedford, Milton Keynes and Aylesbury.

The town is home to Luton Sixth Form College and Barnfield College. Both have been awarded Learning & Skills Beacon Status by the Department for Children, Schools and Families.

Luton's schools and colleges had also been earmarked for major investment in the government scheme Building Schools for the Future programme, which intends to renew and refit buildings in institutes across the country. Luton is in the third wave of this long-term programme with work intending to start in 2009. Some schools were rebuilt before the programme was scrapped by the coalition government.

There are 98 educational institutes in Luton – seven nurseries, 56 primary schools (9 voluntary-aided, 2 special requirements), 13 secondary schools (1 voluntary-aided, 1 special requirements), four further educational institutes and four other educational institutes.

Culture

Architecture

The town contains 92 listed buildings.

Leisure and entertainment

Luton International Carnival

Luton International Carnival is the largest one-day carnival in Europe. It usually takes place on the late May Bank Holiday. Crowds can reach 150,000 on each occasion.

The procession starts at Wardown Park and makes its way down New Bedford Road, around the town centre via St George's Square, back down New Bedford Road and finishes back at Wardown Park. There are music stages and stalls around the town centre and at Wardown Park.

Luton is home to the UK Centre for Carnival Arts (UKCCA), the country's first purpose-built facility of its kind.

Luton St Patrick's Festival
The festival celebrating the patron saint of Ireland St Patrick and organised by Luton Irish Forum, is held on the weekend nearest to 17 March. In its 20th year in 2019, the festival includes a parade, market stalls and music stands as well as Irish themed events.

Luton Mela
The first Luton Melā took place in August 2000 and has developed into one of the most significant and well attended south Asian cultural events in the eastern region.

City of Culture bid and pilot year
Luton Council's strategic vision for the Arts, and Cultural and Creative industries includes the plan to bid for City of Culture Status. This plan includes a pilot year with the theme of Peace Riots starting in Spring 2019. Events will be published on the Luton.Events website.

Theatre and performing arts
Luton is home to the Library Theatre, a 238-seat theatre located on the 3rd floor of the town's Central Library. The theatre's programme consists of local amateur dramatic societies, pantomime, children's theatre (on Saturday mornings) and one night shows of touring theatre companies.

Luton is also home to the Hat Factory, originally as its name suggests, this arts centre was in fact a real hat factory. The Hat Factory is a combined arts venue in the centre of Luton. It opened in 2003 and since then has been the area's main provider of contemporary theatre, dance and music. The venue provides live music, club nights, theatre, dance, films, children's activities, workshops, classes and gallery exhibitions.

Media

Radio
 BBC Three Counties Radio, the local BBC station, broadcasts from its office in Dunstable to Bedfordshire, Hertfordshire and Buckinghamshire.
 Heart East, a formerly independent local station, broadcast from Milton Keynes.
 Diverse FM began broadcasts in April 2007 having been awarded a community radio licence from Ofcom.
 Radio LaB (formerly Luton FM), the university's radio station, began broadcasting full-time in 2010 having been awarded a community radio licence from Ofcom.
 In addition, Radio Ramadhan used to broadcast during the month of Ramadan until Inspire FM, a full-time community radio station, broadcasting on 105.1 FM, became available in 2010.

Television
 Luton is within the Carlton/LWT (ITV London) and BBC London region. However it can also pick up the broadcast area of ITV Anglia and BBC East.

Local attractions

 Dunstable Downs
 Leagrave Park
 Leighton Buzzard Light Railway
 The Hat Factory
 Luton Hoo
 Someries Castle
 Stockwood Discovery Centre
 Stockwood Park
 Wardown Park
 Wardown Park Museum
 Waulud's Bank
 Whipsnade Tree Cathedral
 Whipsnade Zoo
 Woburn Safari Park
 Woodside Farm and Wildfowl Park
 Wrest Park

Recreation

Parks and open spaces
Luton has a variety of parks ranging from district parks, neighbourhood parks, local open space and leisure gardens.

Brantwood Park
In the 1880s, the land now known as Brantwood Park was an open field on the south side of Dallow. The site was purchased by the Town Council in 1894 for use as a recreation ground and there is reference to it as ‘West Ward Recreation Ground' in a 1911-year book. It is reported as being one of the first two recreation grounds in Luton; the other being East Ward Recreation Ground, now known as Manor Road Park.

Kidney Wood
Kidney Wood is ancient semi-natural woodland on the southern edge of Luton that has been identified as a County Wildlife Site. The wood was purchased by Luton Borough Council as an area of public open space. The council seeks to maintain and enhance the nature conservation interest of Kidney Wood, including its habitats while allowing public access for informal recreation including play. Kidney Wood includes a way marked nature trail and play dells.

Memorial Park
Sir Julius Wernher purchased the Luton Hoo Estate and the Manor of Luton from Madame de Falbe around 1903. He carried out substantial renovation works to the Manor and grounds. On his death in 1912 the estate passed to Lady Ludlow. Lady Ludlow presented the Park to the people of Luton on 12 June 1920, in memory of her son Alex Piggott Werner, who was killed in action during the First World War. The site is officially named Luton Hoo Memorial Park. Council records state that the area was purchased under the Statutory Powers of the Public Health Acts.

Stockwood Park

Stockwood Park is a large municipal park near Junction 10 of the M1. Located in the park is Stockwood Discovery Centre, a free museum that houses Luton local social history, archaeology and geology. The collection of rural crafts and trades held at Stockwood Discovery Centre was amassed by Thomas Wyatt Bagshawe, who was a notable local historian and a leading authority on folk life. The park has an athletics track, an 18-hole golf course, several rugby and football pitches and areas of open space. The park was originally the estate and grounds to Stockwood house, which was demolished in 1964.  The museum includes the Mossman Collection of horse-drawn vehicles, which is the largest and most significant vehicle collection of its kind in the country, including originals from the 18th, 19th and 20th centuries.

Wardown Park

Wardown Park is situated on the River Lea in Luton. The park has sporting facilities, is home to the Wardown Park Museum and contains formal gardens. The park is located between Old Bedford Road and the A6, New Bedford Road and is within walking distance of the town centre. The park houses Wardown House Museum and Gallery, previously known as Luton Museum and Art Gallery, in a large Victorian mansion. The museum collection focuses on the traditional crafts and industry of Luton and Bedfordshire, notably lace making and hatmaking. There are samples of local lace from as early as the 17th century.

Shopping

The main shopping area in Luton is centred on the Mall Luton. Built in the 1960s/1970s and opened as an Arndale Centre, construction of the shopping centre led to the demolition of a number of the older buildings in the town centre including the Plait Halls (a Victorian covered market building with an iron and glass roof). Shops and businesses in the remaining streets, particularly in the roads around Cheapside and in High Town, have been in decline ever since. George Street, on the south side of the Arndale, was pedestrianised in the 1990s.

The shopping centre had some construction and re-design work done to it over the 2011/12 period and now has a new square used for leisure events, as well as numerous new food restaurants such as Toby's Carvery and Costa Coffee.

Contained within the main shopping centre is the market, which contains butchers, fishmongers, fruit and veg, hairdressers, tattoo parlours, ice cream, flower stall, T-shirt printing and the markets original sewing shop for clothes alterations and repairs as well as eating places.

Another major shopping area is Bury Park where there are shops catering to Luton's ethnic minorities.

Sport

Luton has a wide range of sports clubs. It's the home town of Luton Town Football Club who currently play in the English football  and whose history includes several spells in the top flight of the English league as well as a League Cup triumph in 1988. They play at Kenilworth Road, their home since 1905, with a new larger capacity stadium known as Power Court under construction. Their nickname, 'The Hatters', dates back to when Luton had a substantial millinery industry, and their logo is based on the town's coat of arms.

Bedfordshire County Cricket Club is based at Wardown Park and is one of the county clubs which make up the Minor Counties in the English domestic cricket structure, representing the historic county of Bedfordshire. Luton Rugby Club are a local rugby union club based on Newlands Road, by the M1 motorway just outside Stockwood Park, who play in London 1 North. Speedway racing was once staged at Luton Stadium from 1934 to 1937.

Twin towns
Luton participates in international town twinning; its partners are:

Notable people

People who were born in Luton or are associated with the town.

By birth

 Mick Abrahams, guitarist for Jethro Tull
 Keshi Anderson, footballer
 David Arnold, composer
 Emily Atack, actress
 John Badham, film director
 Lewis Baker, footballer
 Clive Barker, sculptor and artist
 Jonathan Barnbrook, graphic designer and typographer
 Josh Bassett, rugby player
 Kevin Blackwell, goalkeeper and football manager
 Dean Brill, footballer
 Charles Bronson, born Michael Peterson, prisoner
 William Brown, footballer
 Clive Bunker, drummer for Jethro Tull
 Danny Cannon, screenwriter, director and producer
 Gerald Anthony Coles, artist
 Natasha Collins, actress and television presenter
 Andy Day, television presenter 
 Steve Dillon, comic artist
 Kerry Dixon, footballer
 Stacey Dooley, journalist, television presenter and Strictly Come Dancing winner
 Jamal Edwards, entrepreneur, author, director, DJ and founder of SB.TV
 Jonathan Edwards, footballer
 Kevin Foley, footballer
 Sean Gallagher, actor
 Liam George, footballer
 John Hagan, 8th master chief petty officer, US Navy
 Arthur Hailey, novelist
 Nadiya Hussain, The Great British Bake Off winner
 Neil Jackson, actor
 Sharna Jackson, children's writer
 James Justin, footballer
 Stephen Kelman, novelist
 Stuart Lewis-Evans, Formula One driver
 Sean Maguire, footballer for Preston North End
 Frederick Mander, General Secretary of the NUT
 Sarfraz Manzoor, journalist and author
 Herbert Moody, Luton Town footballer
 Monty Panesar, cricketer
 David Price, cricketer
 Phil Read, motorcycle racer
 David Renwick, scriptwriter
 Stu Riddle, footballer
 Tommy Robinson, born Stephen Yaxley-Lennon, far-right activist
 Lee Ross, actor
 Billy Schwer, boxer
 Andy Selway, drummer
 Gavin Shuker, politician
 Junior Simpson, comedian
 Paul Sinha, comedian and quizzer
 Zena Skinner, television chef and author
 Steven M Smith, biologist
 Will Smith, cricketer
 David Stoten, storyboard artist
 Jordan Thomas, World and European karate champion
 Mark Titchner, artist
 UK Decay, band
 Richard Wiseman, psychologist
 Jamie Woolford, rock musician for The Stereo, Animal Chin and Let Go
 Paul Young, pop rock singer

By association

 Rodney Bewes, actor
 Mo Chaudry, entrepreneur
 Diana Dors, actress
 Ian Dury, singer
 John Hegley, poet
 Hilda Hewlett, UK's first female pilot
 Alec Jeffreys, geneticist
 Sarfraz Manzoor, author and columnist, The Guardian
 Eric Morecambe, entertainer
 Elizabeth Price, artist
 Colin Salmon, actor
 Andrew Tate, British-American ex-kickboxer and internet personality

See also

Notes

References

Bibliography

External links

 
 Luton Borough Council
 Bedfordshire Police
 Bedfordshire Fire and Rescue
 Luton and Dunstable - major local hospital
 Luton Today - local news
 Luton Culture - charity which manages museums and various events
 Luton Town F.C. - local football team

 
Towns in Bedfordshire
Local government districts of Bedfordshire
Unparished areas in Bedfordshire
Unitary authority districts of England
NUTS 3 statistical regions of the United Kingdom
6th-century establishments in England
Hatmaking
Populated places established in the 6th century
Boroughs in England
Former civil parishes in Bedfordshire